The ARO 12m Radio Telescope (ARO12m or KP12m) is a 12-meter dish located on Kitt Peak, approximately  from Tucson in Arizona at an elevation of .

History
The original dish was built in 1967 under the umbrella of the National Radio Astronomy Observatory (NRAO). In 1984, it was renovated with a new backup structure and a slightly larger dish. At this point its name was changed to the 12 Meter Telescope.

In 2000, the NRAO passed control of the telescope to the University of Arizona. The University of Arizona had been operating the Submillimeter Telescope (SMT) located on Mount Graham since 1992. When it took over operations of the 12m, it created the Arizona Radio Observatory (ARO), a part of Steward Observatory of the UArizona College of Science, which now runs both telescopes.

In 2013, the entire antenna (dish and mounting) was replaced with ESO's ALMA prototype antenna, which had been located in New Mexico. The new antenna is the same size (12 meters) but has a much better surface accuracy (thereby permitting use at shorter wavelengths), and a more precise mount with better pointing accuracy.

Observatory Information
This table displays some of the characteristics of the telescope and the site.

Science at the 12m Radio Telescope
In the almost 40 years since it was first built, the 12m Radio Telescope has been at the forefront of millimeter molecular astronomy: studying molecules in space through the use of molecular spectroscopy at millimeter wavelengths. Many of the molecules that have been discovered in the interstellar medium were discovered by the 12m.

See also
 List of astronomical observatories
 Lists of telescopes

References

External links

 ARO's Wiki Page
 Official Web Site of the ARO

Radio telescopes
Astronomical observatories in Arizona
Buildings and structures in Pima County, Arizona
University of Arizona
Kitt Peak National Observatory